House of Councillors elections were held in Japan on 2 June 1959, electing half the seats in the House. The Liberal Democratic Party won the most seats. Kōji Harashima, who later become a founding member and the first chairman of Kōmeitō, was elected to the Diet for the first time as one of several Soka Gakkai-affiliated independents.

During the campaign, Prime Minister Nobusuke Kishi and MITI began to discuss the now-famous "income doubling" plan, although it was temporarily shelved due to disputes between party factions and the looming importance of the US–Japan Security Treaty revision issue. The plan would not be revived until the tenure of Hayato Ikeda, beginning in 1960.

Results

By constituency

References

Japan
House of Councillors (Japan) elections
1959 elections in Japan
June 1959 events in Asia
Election and referendum articles with incomplete results